8th Combat Service Support Battalion (8 CSSB) is a unit of the 5th Brigade of the Australian Army.
Originally formed as 8th Brigade Administrative Support Battalion (8 BASB) in 1995, 8 CSSB is a part-time Army (Reserve) unit with elements at the Timor Barracks at Dundas (Sydney) and the Bullecourt Barracks at Adamstown (Newcastle).
At various times in the past, the unit has had elements at Erina, Taree and Pymble.

Role
The role of 8 CSSB is to provide first and limited second line support to its customer units within the 5th Brigade along with its counterpart unit the 5th Combat Service Support Battalion.

Battalion Composition
8 CSSB comprises a battalion headquarters and four sub-units:
1st Health Company
16th Transport Squadron
111th Workshop Company

Former Commanding Officers
Lieutenant Colonel Stuart Jones RFD (1996-1997)
Lieutenant Colonel Robyn Cragg CSM RFD (1998-1999)
Lieutenant Colonel Martin Wiltshire RFD (2000–2001)
Lieutenant Colonel Russ Mullins CSC (2002–2003)
Lieutenant Colonel Allan Murray (2004–2005)
Lieutenant Colonel Anthony McBride (2006–2007)
Lieutenant Colonel Bill Cowham (2008–2010)
Lieutenant Colonel Ed McCann (2011–2013)
Lieutenant Colonel Amanda Williamson (2014–2015)
Lieutenant Colonel Jodie Lording CSM (2016–2017)
Lieutenant Colonel Michelle Dare (2018-2019)

References

Combat service support battalions of the Australian Army
Military units and formations established in 1995